Phelsuma is a large genus of geckos in the family Gekkonidae. Species in the genus Phelsuma are commonly referred to as day geckos.

Some day geckos are seriously endangered and some are common, but all Phelsuma species are CITES Appendix II listed. Little is known about trade in day geckos, but the IUCN considers it a threat to some species. Some species are captive-bred.

Taxonomy 
The genus itself is thought to have originated anywhere between the Late Cretaceous to the mid-Eocene (43 to 75 mya), as that is when its lineage is known to have diverged from the one containing the Namaqua day gecko (Rhoptropella), although it is unknown how closely related both genera are. The crown group containing all recent species is thought to have originated in the early Oligocene, about 30 million years ago, with the most basal of them being the isolated Andaman day gecko (P. andamanensis), which diverged from all other species shortly after the crown group originated. Most of the other divergence among species in areas of the Western Indian Ocean such as the Seychelles is thought to have occurred in the Neogene.

Description
In contrast to most other gecko species, day geckos of the genus Phelsuma are active mainly during the day. Other diurnal geckos include species of the genera Lygodactylus and Gonatodes. Like most other geckos, day geckos lack eyelids, instead having rounded pupils and a clear, fixed plate covering their eyes which they clean with their tongues.  Many species have bright green, red, and blue colors which make them popular terrarium or vivarium pets. These brilliant colors play a role in intraspecies recognition and also serve as camouflage.

Day geckos have toe pads consisting of tiny lamellae which allow them to walk on plain vertical and inverted surfaces like bamboo or glass. The inner toe on each foot is vestigial. Males have well-developed femoral pores on the undersurface of their rear limbs. These pores are less developed or absent in females. Females often have well-developed endolymphatic chalk sacs on the sides of their necks. These sacs store calcium, which is needed for egg production. Those eggs can often be seen through the ventral surface of the female's body shortly before they are laid. The hatchlings reach sexual maturity between six and 12 months old. Smaller species may live up to 10 years, whereas the larger species have been reported to live more than 20 years in captivity.

Distribution and habitat
Day geckos inhabit the islands of the south-west part of the Indian Ocean. The exceptions are Phelsuma andamanense, which is endemic to the Andaman Islands in the Bay of Bengal, and Phelsuma dubia, which is also found on the East Coast of mainland Africa, although it possibly was introduced there. Most Phelsumas species are found in Mauritius and Madagascar. Some species are found on neighboring island groups, including the Mascarenes, Seychelles, and Comoros. Due to human introduction, they are also often found on some of the Hawaiian Islands, including the Big Island, Maui and Kauai, and the state of Florida, where they were introduced as a form of pest control. The different Phelsuma species can be found from sea level up to 2,300 meters. Most day geckos are arboreal. They inhabit, amongst others, coconut palms and banana trees, but can also be found near human settlements, in gardens, on fences, houses, and huts. An exception, Phelsuma barbouri, is a terrestrial species.

Diet

Day geckos feed on various insects and other invertebrates in the wild. They also eat nectar, pollen, and occasionally soft, ripe and sweet fruits such as bananas.

In captivity, such a diet is simulated.  Insects which may be used include: (wingless) fruit flies, various flies, wax moths, crickets, small super worms, small butter worms and mealworms. Fruit, which is required a few times a week, may be small pieces of papaya, banana, or other sweet fruit and also commercial gecko nectars.

In 2008 a BBC film crew took footage of a day gecko successfully begging a planthopper for honeydew.

Classification

The genus Phelsuma was first described in 1825 by the British zoologist John Edward Gray, who named it after the Dutch physician Murk van Phelsum. The genus consists of about 70 known species and subspecies.

Two Phelsuma species (Phelsuma gigas and Phelsuma edwardnewtoni), both of which were endemic to the Mascarene island of Rodrigues, are now considered to be extinct, probably due to the destruction of their environments by human settlers and their domestic animals. Many day gecko species are endangered today because an increasing percentage of their natural habitat, especially tropical forest, is being destroyed by human activity.

Phelsuma abbotti 
Phelsuma abbotti abbotti  – Aldabra Island day gecko
Phelsuma abbotti chekei  – Cheke's day gecko
Phelsuma abbotti sumptio  – Assumption Island day gecko
Phelsuma andamanensis  – Andaman Islands day gecko
Phelsuma antanosy 
Phelsuma astriata  – Seychelles day gecko
 Phelsuma astriata astovei 
Phelsuma astriata astriata  – Seychelles small day gecko
Phelsuma astriata semicarinata 
Phelsuma barbouri  – Barbour's day gecko
Phelsuma berghofi 
Phelsuma borai 
Phelsuma borbonica 
Phelsuma borbonica agalegae  – Agalega day gecko
Phelsuma borbonica borbonica  – Reunion Island day gecko
Phelsuma borbonica mater 
Phelsuma breviceps 
Phelsuma cepediana  – blue-tailed day gecko
Phelsuma comorensis 
Phelsuma dorsivittata 
Phelsuma dubia  – dull day gecko, Zanzibar day gecko
Phelsuma edwardnewtoni  – Rodrigues day gecko (extinct, last seen 1917)
Phelsuma flavigularis  – yellow-throated day gecko
Phelsuma gigas  – Rodrigues giant day gecko (extinct, last seen 1842)
Phelsuma gouldi 
Phelsuma grandis  – Madagascar giant day gecko
Phelsuma guentheri  – Round Island day gecko
Phelsuma guimbeaui  – orange-spotted day gecko, Mauritius lowland forest day gecko
Phelsuma guttata  – speckled day gecko
Phelsuma hielscheri 
Phelsuma hoeschi 
Phelsuma inexpectata  – Reunion Island ornate day gecko
Phelsuma kely 
Phelsuma klemmeri  – yellow-headed day gecko
Phelsuma kochi 
Phelsuma laticauda  – broad-tailed day gecko
Phelsuma laticauda angularis 
Phelsuma laticauda laticauda  – gold dust day gecko
Phelsuma lineata 
Phelsuma lineata bombetokensis 
Phelsuma lineata elanthana 
Phelsuma lineata lineata 
Phelsuma madagascariensis 
Phelsuma madagascariensis boehmei  – Boehme's giant day gecko 
Phelsuma madagascariensis madagascariensis  – Madagascar day gecko
Phelsuma malamakibo  
Phelsuma masohoala  
Phelsuma modesta  – modest day gecko 
Phelsuma modesta leiogaster 
Phelsuma modesta modesta  
Phelsuma mutabilis  – thicktail day gecko
Phelsuma nigristriata  – island day gecko
Phelsuma ornata  – Mauritius ornate day gecko
Phelsuma parkeri  – Pemba Island day gecko
Phelsuma parva 
Phelsuma pasteuri  – Pasteur's day gecko
Phelsuma pronki 
Phelsuma punctulata  – striped day gecko
Phelsuma pusilla 
Phelsuma pusilla hallmanni  – Hallmann's day gecko
Phelsuma pusilla pusilla 
Phelsuma quadriocellata  – peacock day gecko
Phelsuma quadriocellata quadriocellata  – four-spotted day gecko
Phelsuma quadriocellata bimaculata 
Phelsuma quadriocellata lepida 
Phelsuma ravenala 
Phelsuma robertmertensi  – Robert Mertens's day gecko
Phelsuma roesleri 
Phelsuma rosagularis  – Mauritius upland forest day gecko
Phelsuma seippi  – Seipp's day gecko
Phelsuma serraticauda  – flat-tailed day gecko
Phelsuma standingi  – Standing's day gecko
Phelsuma sundbergi  – Praslin Island day gecko
Phelsuma sundbergi ladiguensis  – La Digue day gecko
Phelsuma sundbergi longinsulae  – Mahé day gecko
Phelsuma sundbergi sundbergi  – Seychelles giant day gecko
 
Phelsuma vanheygeni 
Phelsuma v-nigra  – Indian day gecko
Phelsuma v-nigra anjouanensis  – Anjouan Island day gecko
Phelsuma v-nigra comoraegrandensis  – Grand Comoro day gecko
Phelsuma v-nigra v-nigra 

Nota bene: A binomial authority or trinomial authority in parentheses indicates that the species or subspecies was originally described in a genus other than Phelsuma.

References

External links
Phelsumania.com
Gekkota.com
Phelsuma.nl
Phelsuma at the Reptile Database

Further reading
Berghof H-P (2016). Taggeckos der Gattung Phelsuma: Lebensweise – Haltung – Nachzucht. Münster, Germany: Natur und Tier Verlag. 192 pp. . (in German).

Gehring P-S, Crottini A, Glaw F, Hauswaldt S, Ratsoavina FM (2010). "Notes on the natural history, distribution and malformations of day geckos (Phelsuma) from Madagascar". Herpetology Notes 3: 321-327.
Glaw F, Rösler H (2015). "Taxonomic checklist of the day geckos of the genera Phelsuma Gray, 1825 and Rhoptropella Hewitt, 1937 (Squamata: Gekkonidae)". Vertebrate Zoology 65 (2): 247–283.
Gray JE (1825). "A Synopsis of the Genera of Reptiles and Amphibia, with a Description of some new Species". Annals of Philosophy. New Series [Series 2] 10: 193-217. (Phelsuma, new genus, p. 199).
Rocha S, Rösler H, Gehring P-S, Glaw F, Posada D, Harris DJ, Vences M (2010). "Phylogenetic systematics of day geckos, genus Phelsuma, based on molecular and morphological data (Squamata: Gekkonidae)". Zootaxa 2429: 1–28.

 
Fauna of the Mascarene Islands
Reptiles of Mauritius
Fauna of Seychelles
Reptiles of Madagascar
Lizard genera
Taxa named by John Edward Gray